Anne Rydning (born 27 February 1965 in Narvik, Norway) is a Colonel and head of department of operation management in the Norwegian army staff. Has varied military background. Academy Graduate. Has worked as a platoon and company commander at the engineer battalion Skjold. Has also worked in the Defence Logistics Organisation and the Defence Ministry. In recent years she has worked in Hærstaben (Norwegian army)

In January 2011 she took over as the first female chief of the Norwegian forces in Afghanistan .

See also
PRT Meymaneh

References

Living people
1965 births
People from Narvik
Norwegian women
Recipients of the Military Order of the Cross of the Eagle, Class IV
21st-century Norwegian women
21st-century Norwegian military personnel
20th-century Norwegian women
20th-century Norwegian military personnel